Kim Kab-seung (Korean: 김갑승; born July 19, 1966) is a South Korean male wheelchair curler.

Wheelchair curling teams and events

References

External links 

Living people
1966 births
South Korean male curlers
South Korean wheelchair curlers
Place of birth missing (living people)